Juhani Vellamo (4 April 1912–22 May 2004) was a Finnish male former weightlifter, who competed in the light heavyweight class and represented Finland at international competitions. He won the bronze medal at the 1947 World Weightlifting Championships in the 82.5 kg category. He also competed at the 1948 Summer Olympics and the 1952 Summer Olympics.

References

External links

1912 births
2004 deaths
Finnish male weightlifters
World Weightlifting Championships medalists
Olympic weightlifters of Finland
Weightlifters at the 1948 Summer Olympics
Weightlifters at the 1952 Summer Olympics
20th-century Finnish people
21st-century Finnish people